Ricky Leonard Stokes (born March 29, 1962) is an American athletics administrator and former men's college basketball coach who is currently the associate commissioner of men's basketball for the Mid-American Conference.

Player

Stokes played at Highland Springs High School for Coach George Lancaster before committing to Coach Terry Holland. As a point guard for the Virginia Cavaliers, Stokes set the record for career games played with 134, a record that he still holds.  The Cavaliers made the NCAA Men's Division I Basketball Championship each year that Stokes was with the team and during the three years that Stokes played along the legendary Ralph Sampson, the team earned a #1 seed.

Coach

Stokes was hired in 1999 by Jim Weaver, the new director of athletics at Virginia Tech, to replace the fired Bobby Hussey.

In his first year as coach, Stokes brought the Hokies their first winning season since the departure of Bill Foster but that year would be his high water mark in Blacksburg.  Beginning with the 2000–01 season, the Hokies departed the Atlantic 10 Conference and joined the much tougher Big East.  Stokes was unable to recruit Big East level talent to Virginia Tech and the team's record suffered accordingly.

The highlight of his four seasons at Tech were blowout wins over #18 Connecticut and rival Virginia his final year.  Stokes was dismissed after a third straight losing season and a 10–38 overall record in the Big East. In none of these three years in the Big East was Virginia Tech able to qualify for the conference post-season tournament under Stokes.

After two years as an assistant coach at the University of South Carolina, Stokes was hired as the head men's basketball coach at East Carolina University after the 2004–2005 season. After compiling a 14–44 record in two seasons, Stokes chose to resign rather than accept an administrative position within the ECU athletic department.

The Mid-American Conference named Stokes the associate commissioner for men's basketball in 2010.

Head coaching record

References

1962 births
Living people
American men's basketball coaches
American men's basketball players
Basketball coaches from Virginia
Basketball players from Richmond, Virginia
Bowling Green Falcons men's basketball coaches
East Carolina Pirates men's basketball coaches
Point guards
South Carolina Gamecocks men's basketball coaches
Texas Longhorns men's basketball coaches
Virginia Cavaliers men's basketball coaches
Virginia Cavaliers men's basketball players
Virginia Tech Hokies men's basketball coaches
Wake Forest Demon Deacons men's basketball coaches